Tetrachloronickelate is the metal complex with the formula [NiCl4]2−.  Salts of the complex are available with a variety of cations, but a common one is tetraethylammonium.

When concentrated lithium chloride and nickel chloride solution in water is mixed, only a pentaaquachloro complex is formed: [Ni(H2O)5Cl]+.  However in other organic solvents, or molten salts the tetrachloronickelate ion can form. Nickel can be separated from such a solution in water or methanol, by partitioning it into a cyclohexane solution of amines.

Organic ammonium salts of the type (R3NH)2[NiCl4] are often thermochromic (R = Me, Et, Pr).  Near room temperature, these salts are yellow , but these solids become blue when heated to near 70 °C. The bright blue color is characteristic of tetrahedral [NiCl4]2−, the intensity being a consequence of the Laporte selection rule.  The yellow color results from a polymer consisting of octahedral Ni centers. The corresponding tetrabromonickelates are also thermochromic with a lower transition temperatures.

History
The blue colour due to the tetrachloronickelate ion was first observed in 1944 when Remy and Meyer melted cesium chloride and cesium nickel trichloride together.

Compounds

Related substances
tetrabromonickelates

References

Nickel complexes
Inorganic chlorine compounds
Chlorometallates